Hugon, The Mighty is a lost 1918 silent film Northwoods drama directed by Rollin S. Sturgeon and starring Monroe Salisbury. It was produced by Bluebird Photoplays and released through Universal Film Manufacturing Company.

Cast
Monroe Salisbury - Hugon
Margery Bennett - Marie
Antrim Short - Gabriel
Thomas H. Pearse - Priest
George Holt - Roque
Sarah Kernan - Gabriel's  Mother (*as Mrs. Kernan)
Tote Du Crow - ?
Roy Watkins - ?

References

External links
 Hugon, The Mighty at IMDb.com

lantern slide(Wayback Machine)

1918 films
American silent feature films
Lost American films
Universal Pictures films
Silent American drama films
1918 drama films
American black-and-white films
Films directed by Rollin S. Sturgeon
1918 lost films
Lost drama films
1910s American films
1910s English-language films